Fernandas Bowen Eunick (April 22, 1892 – December 9, 1959) was a Major League Baseball third baseman who played for the Cleveland Indians. He played in one game on August 29, 1917 during the 1917 Cleveland Indians season.

External links

1892 births
1959 deaths
Cleveland Indians players
Major League Baseball third basemen
Paris Red Snappers players
Oklahoma City Senators players
Marshalltown Ansons players
Baseball players from Baltimore
Easton Farmers players